Hubert Ott (born 6 June 1964) is a French politician from MoDem who has represented Haut-Rhin's 2nd constituency in the National Assembly since defeating incumbent Jacques Cattin in 2022.

References

See also 

 List of deputies of the 16th National Assembly of France

1964 births
Living people
People from Colmar
21st-century French politicians
Democratic Movement (France) politicians
Deputies of the 16th National Assembly of the French Fifth Republic